Sergio Villalobos Rivera (born April 19, 1930) is a Chilean historian, and Chilean National History Award in 1992. Among his most significant works is the Historia del pueblo Chileno (History of the Chilean people).

References 

1930 births
20th-century Chilean historians
20th-century Chilean male writers
21st-century Chilean historians
21st-century Chilean male writers
Chilean academics
People from Angol
Living people
University of Chile alumni